2,4-Oxazolidinedione is an organic compound with the formula HN(CO)2OCH2.  It is a white solid.  The parent ring is not particularly important, but this core structure is found in a variety anticonvulsant drugs.  The parent compound is obtained by treating chloroacetamide with bicarbonate.

See also
 Glycine N-carboxyanhydride, the parent  2,5-oxazolidinedione

References

Anticonvulsants